Pinalitus rubricatus is a species of plant bug in the family Miridae. It is found in the Palearctic and North America.

References

Further reading

External links
Pinalitus rubricatus images at  Consortium for the Barcode of Life

Articles created by Qbugbot
Insects described in 1807
Mirini
Taxa named by Carl Fredrik Fallén